Glycoside hydrolases (O-Glycosyl hydrolases)  are a widespread group of enzymes that hydrolyse the glycosidic bond between two or more carbohydrates, or between a carbohydrate and a non-carbohydrate moiety. A classification system for glycosyl hydrolases, based on sequence similarity, has led to the definition of numerous different families. This classification is available on the CAZy (CArbohydrate-Active EnZymes) web site. Because the fold of proteins is better conserved than their sequences, some of the families can be grouped in 'clans'. As of October 2011, CAZy includes 128 families of glycosyl hydrolases and 14 clans.

Glycoside hydrolase family 1
Glycoside hydrolase family 2
Glycoside hydrolase family 3
Glycoside hydrolase family 4
Glycoside hydrolase family 5
Glycoside hydrolase family 6
Glycoside hydrolase family 7
Glycoside hydrolase family 8
Glycoside hydrolase family 9
Glycoside hydrolase family 10
Glycoside hydrolase family 11
Glycoside hydrolase family 12
Glycoside hydrolase family 13
Glycoside hydrolase family 14
Glycoside hydrolase family 15
Glycoside hydrolase family 16
Glycoside hydrolase family 17
Glycoside hydrolase family 18
Glycoside hydrolase family 19
Glycoside hydrolase family 20
Glycoside hydrolase family 21
Glycoside hydrolase family 22
Glycoside hydrolase family 23
Glycoside hydrolase family 24
Glycoside hydrolase family 25
Glycoside hydrolase family 26
Glycoside hydrolase family 27
Glycoside hydrolase family 28
Glycoside hydrolase family 29
Glycoside hydrolase family 30
Glycoside hydrolase family 31
Glycoside hydrolase family 32
Glycoside hydrolase family 33
Glycoside hydrolase family 34
Glycoside hydrolase family 35
Glycoside hydrolase family 36
Glycoside hydrolase family 37
Glycoside hydrolase family 38
Glycoside hydrolase family 39
Glycoside hydrolase family 40
Glycoside hydrolase family 41
Glycoside hydrolase family 42
Glycoside hydrolase family 43
Glycoside hydrolase family 44
Glycoside hydrolase family 45
Glycoside hydrolase family 46
Glycoside hydrolase family 47
Glycoside hydrolase family 48
Glycoside hydrolase family 49
Glycoside hydrolase family 50
Glycoside hydrolase family 51
Glycoside hydrolase family 52
Glycoside hydrolase family 53
Glycoside hydrolase family 54
Glycoside hydrolase family 55
Glycoside hydrolase family 56
Glycoside hydrolase family 57
Glycoside hydrolase family 58
Glycoside hydrolase family 59
Glycoside hydrolase family 60
Glycoside hydrolase family 61
Glycoside hydrolase family 62
Glycoside hydrolase family 63
Glycoside hydrolase family 64
Glycoside hydrolase family 65
Glycoside hydrolase family 66
Glycoside hydrolase family 67
Glycoside hydrolase family 68
Glycoside hydrolase family 69
Glycoside hydrolase family 70
Glycoside hydrolase family 71
Glycoside hydrolase family 72
Glycoside hydrolase family 73
Glycoside hydrolase family 74
Glycoside hydrolase family 75
Glycoside hydrolase family 76
Glycoside hydrolase family 77
Glycoside hydrolase family 78
Glycoside hydrolase family 79
Glycoside hydrolase family 80
Glycoside hydrolase family 81
Glycoside hydrolase family 82
Glycoside hydrolase family 83
Glycoside hydrolase family 84
Glycoside hydrolase family 85
Glycoside hydrolase family 86
Glycoside hydrolase family 87
Glycoside hydrolase family 88
Glycoside hydrolase family 89
Glycoside hydrolase family 90
Glycoside hydrolase family 91
Glycoside hydrolase family 92
Glycoside hydrolase family 93
Glycoside hydrolase family 94
Glycoside hydrolase family 95
Glycoside hydrolase family 96
Glycoside hydrolase family 97
Glycoside hydrolase family 98
Glycoside hydrolase family 99
Glycoside hydrolase family 100
Glycoside hydrolase family 101
Glycoside hydrolase family 102
Glycoside hydrolase family 103
Glycoside hydrolase family 104
Glycoside hydrolase family 105
Glycoside hydrolase family 106
Glycoside hydrolase family 107
Glycoside hydrolase family 108
Glycoside hydrolase family 109
Glycoside hydrolase family 110
Glycoside hydrolase family 111
Glycoside hydrolase family 112
Glycoside hydrolase family 113
Glycoside hydrolase family 114
Glycoside hydrolase family 115
Glycoside hydrolase family 116
Glycoside hydrolase family 117
Glycoside hydrolase family 118
Glycoside hydrolase family 119
Glycoside hydrolase family 120
Glycoside hydrolase family 121
Glycoside hydrolase family 122
Glycoside hydrolase family 123
Glycoside hydrolase family 124
Glycoside hydrolase family 125
Glycoside hydrolase family 126
Glycoside hydrolase family 127
Glycoside hydrolase family 128

References

Carbohydrate chemistry
EC 3.2.1
Glycobiology
GH family